The Kompienga Dam is a large hydro-electric dam in Kompienga Province in southeastern Burkina Faso. Constructed between 1985 and 1988, it is the country's first hydro-electric dam and is responsible for much of Ouagadougou's electricity supply. Visitors can obtain a permit to visit the control room of the dam from the state electricity parastatal.

References

Dams in Burkina Faso
Kompienga Province
Dams completed in 1988